Imam Mohammad Ahmad Eissa or Sheikh Imam (July 2, 1918 – June 6, 1995 ) was a famous Egyptian composer and singer. For most of his life, he formed a duo with the famous Egyptian colloquial poet Ahmed Fouad Negm. Together, they were known for their political songs in favor of the poor and the working classes.

Life and career
Imam was born to a poor family in the Egyptian village of Abul Numrus in Giza. He lost his sight when he was a child. At the age of five he joined a recitation class, where he memorized the Qur’an. He later moved to Cairo to study where he led a dervish life. In Cairo, Imam met Sheikh Darwish el-Hareery, a prominent musical figure at that time, who taught him the basics of music and muwashshah singing. He then worked with the Egyptian composer Zakariyya Ahmad. At that time, he expressed interest in Egyptian folk songs especially those by Sayed Darwish and Abdou el-Hamouly. He also performed at weddings and birthdays.

In 1962 he met the Egyptian poet Ahmed Fouad Negm. For many years, they formed a duo composing and singing political songs, mostly in favor of the poor oppressed classes and indicting the ruling classes. Though their songs were banned on Egyptian Radio and Television stations, they were popular among ordinary people in the 1960s and 1970s. Their revolutionary songs criticizing the government after the 1967 war led them to imprisonment and detention several times. In the mid 80s Imam performed several concerts in France, Britain, Lebanon, Tunisia, Libya and Algeria. Later Imam and Negm broke up after several disagreements. Imam died at the age of 76 after a long illness.

Notable songs
 "" masr yamma ya bheyya ("Egypt, O beautiful mother")
 "" givāra māt ("Guevara has died")
 "" el-fallahīn ("the fellahin")
 "" ye‘īš ahl baladi ("long live the people of my country")
 "" sharraft ya nekson bāba ("it's been an honor, father Nixon" (sarcastic))
 "" ‘an mawdū‘ el-fūl wel-lahma ("on the topic of fūl and meat")
 "" baqaret hāhā ("Haha's cow")
 "" valari giscār destān ("Valéry Giscard d'Estaing")
 "" sign el-'al‘a ("the citadel prison")
 "" tahrān ("Tehran")
 "" gā'izet nōbel ("Nobel Prize")
 "" gāba klabha diaba ("a wilderness whose dogs are wolves")
 "" ya masr 'ūmi ("O, Egypt, rise")
 "" iza š-šams gir'et ("if the Sun drowned")
 "" šayyed 'usūrak ‘al mazāre‘ ("erect your palaces on the farms")
 "" ’ana š-ša‘bi māši w-‘āref tarī’i ("We are the people, we are marching, and we know our path")

References

 
 Imam at his 16th anniversary

External links
 Sheikh Imam complete work Remastered on SoundCloud
 AlSheikhImam
 A fan site for Sheikh Imam and Ahmad Fouad Negm 
 moultaka
 akhnaton57

1918 births
1995 deaths
Egyptian musicians
Egyptian composers
People from Giza Governorate
Blind musicians
20th-century composers